Nocardiopsis valliformis  is an alkaliphilic bacterium from the genus of Nocardiopsis which has been isolated from soil from an alkali lake in China.

References

External links
Type strain of Nocardiopsis valliformis at BacDive -  the Bacterial Diversity Metadatabase	

Actinomycetales
Bacteria described in 2008